Friedrich Hegar (11 October 1841 – 2 June 1927) was a Swiss composer, conductor, and founding conductor of Tonhalle-Orchester Zürich.

References

Bibliography

External links

1841 births
1927 deaths
19th-century classical composers
19th-century male musicians
20th-century classical composers
20th-century conductors (music)
20th-century male musicians
Male classical violinists
Male conductors (music)
Musicians from Basel-Stadt
Romantic composers
Swiss classical composers
Swiss classical violinists
Swiss conductors (music)
Swiss male classical composers
20th-century Swiss composers